Christian Beck (born 10 March 1988) is a German professional footballer who plays as a forward for BFC Dynamo.

Career 
Beck made his professional debut on 30 April 2010 in the 3. Liga for FC Rot-Weiß Erfurt in a 1–1 home draw with SV Wacker Burghausen.

References

External links 
 
 

1988 births
Living people
Sportspeople from Erfurt
German footballers
Footballers from Thuringia
Association football forwards
2. Bundesliga players
3. Liga players
Regionalliga players
FC Rot-Weiß Erfurt players
Hallescher FC players
Torgelower FC Greif players
VfB Germania Halberstadt players
1. FC Magdeburg players
Berliner FC Dynamo players